Eric Shawn is an American television news anchor and reporter for the Fox News, based in Manhattan alongside co-anchor Arthel Neville.

Early life and education 
Shawn is the son of Gilbert Shawn and Melba Rae, an actress best known for her long-running role as Marge Bergman on Search for Tomorrow. He graduated from Trinity School in New York City and Georgetown University  with a degree in urban studies. Shawn had a cameo role as a reporter in the 1990 film Gremlins 2: The New Batch.

Career 
Shawn worked as a reporter for WNYC TV at NYC City Hall during the Mayor Koch Years and WNYW (FOX) and WPIX in New York before joining Fox News' affiliate news service, Fox News Edge as the Fox Network Anchor and Correspondent. Shawn has covered many of the major national and international stories over the past few decades, including: the Gulf War, the 1992 Clinton campaign, the Democratic and Republican national conventions, and the O. J. Simpson murder case among many other breaking stories.

In 2001, Mafia hitman Frank Sheeran told Shawn that he shot labor leader Jimmy Hoffa in a house in Detroit on July 30, 1975 and Shawn led the team that found blood evidence on that house's floor in 2004. Shawn's efforts led to the publication of the book I Heard You Paint Houses and the film The Irishman.” He is the anchor of the special Fox Nation series about the Hoffa case, “Riddle: The Search For James R. Hoffa.”

Shawn anchored on Fox News Channel on election night in 2014 and 2016 and has produced and reported a variety of documentary specials, including "Riddle: The Search for James R. Hoffa" on the streaming service Fox Nation. He currently co-anchors the weekend programs of 'America's News Headquarters" with Arthel Neville as well as anchors during the week and serves as the Senior Correspondent for the network.

 Notable interview subjects 
 President of Iran Mahmoud Ahmadinejad (September 24, 2010)
 Israeli Prime Minister Shimon Peres (September 28, 2016)
 Israeli Prime Minister Benjamin Netanyahu
 President of Venezuela Hugo Chávez
 British Prime Minister Tony Blair
 Prime Minister of Pakistan Benazir Bhutto

Filmography

BooksThe U.N. Exposed: How the United Nations Sabotages America's Security and Fails the World''. Sentinel (May 4, 2006)

See also
 New Yorkers in journalism

References

External links
Fox News Bio

Georgetown University alumni
Living people
Fox News people
Trinity School (New York City) alumni
Journalists from New York City
Year of birth missing (living people)